David Cruz may refer to:
 David Antonio Cruz, American artist
 David Cruz Vélez, Puerto Rican politician